Serhat Yapıcı (born 22 July 1988) is a Turkish-German footballer who plays for Tallinna Kalev in the Estonian Meistriliiga.

Career 
He used to play for Hacettepe in the Turkish Süper Lig before the club got relegated in 2009.

Yapıcı is a former member of the Turkey national under-21 football team.

References 

1988 births
Living people
JK Tallinna Kalev players
Meistriliiga players
Expatriate footballers in Estonia
Association football midfielders
Turkish footballers
Turkish expatriate footballers
Hacettepe S.K. footballers
Turkish expatriate sportspeople in Estonia